USCAR means: 
 United States Council for Automotive Research
 US Climate Action Report
 United States Civil Administration of the Ryukyu Islands